St. Anne Catholic Community is a Roman Catholic parish of the Archdiocese of Chicago located in suburban Barrington, Illinois approximately thirty-two miles northwest of Chicago. Originally dedicated in 1884, St. Anne is the only Catholic parish in the Barrington area.

In 2000, the church was expanded significantly to accommodate its 3,700+ registered parishioner families; at the time, its Campus Development Plan was the largest in the modern history of the Archdiocese. Rev. Bernie Pietrzak is the current pastor, replacing Rev. John "Jack" Dewes, who served the community through 2009.

History

Early history
St. Anne's history dates to the 1860s, when missionary priests celebrated the Mass in private Barrington homes, then a largely rural area. The original St. Anne Church was dedicated in 1884, and St. Anne's maintained a resident pastor beginning in 1905.  St. Anne was named for St. Anne, the mother of the Virgin Mary.

In or around 1949, St. Anne dedicated a new church at the southeast corner of Franklin and Ela Streets. The church served as the main worship space for the parish until the construction of the current St. Anne campus.

Campus Development Plan
In 1995, St. Anne approached several design firms regarding a multimillion-dollar update and expansion of its undersized facilities. The parish had outgrown its original church building by such a wide margin that some weekly Masses were held in the school gymnasium. After careful consideration, parish leaders chose lead architect RuckPate and YHR Partners to jointly facilitate a comprehensive master plan for the parish expansion.

YHR and RuckPate designed the new worship space to employ non-traditional, antiphonal seating with a shallow mezzanine to maintain the intimacy of the worship area. The project also included improvements to other parish families on site for fellowship, religious education, parochial education, youth activities, senior activities, outreach ministries, and administration functions.  The parish dedicated the new building on April 30, 2000.  Later that year, the parish received the 2000 Association of Licensed Architects Design Award.  Among numerous other neo-Gothic artworks, the newly constructed Worship Space features twelve near life-size sculptures of saints by Jay Hall Carpenter.

Features
In 2000, the newly expanded church received the Association of Licensed Architects Award of Excellence in Architecture for its limestone and neo-Gothic design. The current St. Anne campus features a 1300-seat, two-story Worship Space, a 160-seat chapel (site of the church dedicated in 1949), and the St. Anne School for elementary education.  The Campus also contains a Gathering Space and Parish Library, in addition to the parish rectory and administrative offices. Since its expansion, the parish has grown to over 4,000 registered member families.

Until recently, the church's longest-subscribing parishioner was Jim Hollister, who had been registered with the parish since his baptism in 1925 and died in Barrington in November 2009.

St. Anne School
In 1927, the Sisters of Mercy founded and staffed the first St. Anne School, one of the earliest parochial schools in Lake County. Three years later, the School Sisters of St. Francis took charge of the school and still minister in the parish today. The co-educational school numbers approximately 500 students, teaching children from three-year-old preschool through eighth grade.  The U.S. Department of Education has recognized St. Anne's School as a Blue Ribbon School.

Image gallery

References

External links
Website of St. Anne Catholic Community
Website of St. Anne School
RuckPate architects website with image gallery of St. Anne redevelopment

Churches in the Roman Catholic Archdiocese of Chicago
Buildings and structures in Barrington, Illinois
Churches in Cook County, Illinois
Churches in Lake County, Illinois
Religious organizations established in 1884